Manoj Mendis (born 13 November 1974) is a Sri Lankan former cricketer. He played in 95 first-class and 50 List A matches between 1993/94 and 2004/05. He made his Twenty20 debut on 17 August 2004, for Burgher Recreation Club in the 2004 SLC Twenty20 Tournament. He later became a match referee, and was the match referee who raised concerns of ball tampering during a practice match on England's tour of Sri Lanka in 2012.

References

External links
 

1974 births
Living people
Sri Lankan cricketers
Burgher Recreation Club cricketers
Sebastianites Cricket and Athletic Club cricketers
Place of birth missing (living people)